Cycloes is a genus of crabs in the family Calappidae, containing the following species:
 Cycloes bairdii Stimpson, 1860
 Cycloes granulosa De Haan, 1837
 Cycloes marisrubri Galil & Clark, 1996

References

Calappoidea